Tillandsia weberi is a species of flowering plant in the genus Tillandsia.

References
 Notizbl. Bot. Gart. Berlin-Dahlem 10: 218 1928.
 The Plant List entry
 GBIF entry
 Encyclopedia of Life entry

werdermannii